Mirza Ali Behrouze Ispahani was a Bangladeshi businessman from the Ispahani family and the chairman of M. M. Ispahani Limited.

Early life
Behrouze was born on 30 October 1950, in the Ispahani family, which was founded in 1820, Haji Mohammed Hashem (1789-1850), the founder of Ispahani Group, who moved from Ispahan (Isfahan) in Persia to Bombay, and established the business. After the death of his father Mirza Mehdy Ispahani he was elected Chairman of the M.M. Ispahani. He completed SSC from St Joseph Higher Secondary School, Dhaka.

Career 
Behrouze was chairman of MM Ispahani Ltd from 2004 until his demise in January 2017. He was a member of the Board of Trustees of the Independent University, Bangladesh (IUB). He was also a Sponsor Director and Managing Director of the International Publications Limited (IPL), the owning company of The Financial Express (FE). The government of Bangladesh gave him the title of Commercially Important Person.

Social activities
Behrouze was chairman of the Ispahani Islamia Eye Institute and Hospital, and Ispahani Public School and College.

Awards and achievements
M.M. Ispahani was awarded 'Enterprise of the Year 2003' by the Bangladesh Business Award. He played a role in the country's economic growth by reinvesting more.

Death
Behrouze died on 23 January 2017 at the age of 67 in Bangladesh. He was buried in Hoseni Dalan Mosque, Dhaka. In a condolence message, the prime minister Sheikh Hasina, recalled with gratitude his contributions towards flourishing trade and commerce and industry in Bangladesh through his reputed industrial group.

See also
 Mirza Ahmad Ispahani, Chairman (1934-1949)
 Mirza Mehdy Ispahani (Sadri Ispahani), Chairman (1949-2004)

References

Mirza Ali Behrouze
Bangladeshi businesspeople
1950 births
2017 deaths